Vietnamese Canadians are Canadian citizens of Vietnamese ancestry. As of 2016, there are 240,615 Vietnamese Canadians, most of whom reside in the provinces of Ontario, British Columbia, Alberta, and Quebec.

History
Mainstream Vietnamese communities began arriving in Canada in the mid-1970s and early 1980s as refugees or boat people following the end of the Vietnam War in 1975, though a couple thousand were already living in Quebec before then, most of whom were students. After the fall of Saigon, there were two waves of Vietnamese immigrants to Canada. The first wave consisted mostly of middle-class immigrants. Many of these immigrants were able to speak French and or English and were welcomed into Canada for their professional skills. The second wave consisted of Southern Vietnamese refugees who were escaping the harsh regime that had taken over the former South Vietnam. Many of them (10%) were of Chinese descent and were escaping ethnic persecution resulting from the Sino-Vietnamese War. These south Vietnamese refugees were known globally as the "boat people".

In the years 1979–80, Canada accepted 60,000 Vietnamese refugees. Most new arrivees were sponsored by groups of individuals, temples, and churches and settled in areas around Southern Ontario, Vancouver, British Columbia, and Montreal, Quebec. Between 1975 and 1985, 110,000 resettled in Canada (23,000 in Ontario; 13,000 in Quebec; 8,000 in Alberta; 7,000 British Columbia; 5,000 in Manitoba; 3,000 in Saskatchewan; and 2,000 in the Maritime provinces). As time passed, most eventually settled in urban centres like Vancouver (2.2% Vietnamese), Calgary (1.6% Vietnamese), Montreal (1.6% Vietnamese), Edmonton (1.6% Vietnamese), Toronto (1.4% Vietnamese), Ottawa (1.0% Vietnamese), and Hamilton (0.8% Vietnamese).

The next wave of Vietnamese migration came in the late 1980s and 1990s as both refugees and immigrant classes of post-war Vietnam entered Canada. These groups settled in urban areas, in particular Toronto, Vancouver, Montreal, and Calgary. In Metro Vancouver, they have settled mainly in East Vancouver, Richmond, and Surrey. In the Montreal area, they settle in Montreal's downtown,  South Shore, and the suburb of Laval. In Toronto, they have settled in the city's Chinatown area near Spadina Avenue and Dundas Street West and in the inner suburbs of North York, York, Scarborough, and Etobicoke. Other municipalities in the Toronto area with large Vietnamese Canadian populations include Mississauga, Brampton, Vaughan, and Markham.

Demographics 
According to the 2011 National Household Survey, approximately 50% of Vietnamese Canadians identify as Buddhist, 25% identify as Christian, and the rest reported having no religious affiliation.

Community issues

Crime, poverty, and gangs

A report done by UBC graduate Andrea Gillman Vietnamese-Canadians were more likely than other visible minorities to face barriers to employment, assimilation, and language proficiency. Gillman stated that family, cultural, and employment factors contributed to the prevalence of Vietnamese crime, poverty, and gang violence.

In The New Start for Vietnamese-Canadian Community Forum, the Lac Viet Public Education Society surveyed individuals to identify the causes of crime and victimization within the community. The results have been used to run a series of radio shows addressing these issues. Gang-related issues were identified as the area of most concern, followed by safety, grow-ops, education and health. Employment, family, and school issues were listed as the root cause of crime and victimization. [...] Issues identified specifically by youth as areas of major concern are those related to school, gangs, safety and family. Under these headings, issues include bullying, kidnapping and violence; recruitment into illegal activities; selling and smoking marijuana in schools; and recruitment of female youth into sexual activities.

Notable Canadians of Vietnamese origin

Business

In Canada, local Vietnamese media includes:
 Viet Nam Thoi Bao — Edmonton magazine
 Thoi Bao — Toronto newspaper
  Thoi Bao TV — Toronto
  Thoi Moi — Toronto newspaper
 Little Saigon Canada — Toronto newspaper
  Vietnamville — Montreal
 Phố Việt Montreal, printed newspaper of Vietnamville.ca
  Viethomes Magazine — Toronto magazine
  Culture Magazin — national magazine, first-ever bilingual English-Vietnamese magazine in Canada

In Vancouver, a large population of Vietnamese Canadians are self-employed; they're business owners of a variety of businesses, stores and restaurants throughout the city. Vietnamese Canadians also brought their cuisine and phở has become a popular food throughout the city. Vietnamese Canadians also reside in Central City, Surrey, which is a rapidly growing suburb of Metro Vancouver.

In the Toronto area, there are 19 Vietnamese owned supermarkets.

In Montreal there are about 40,000 Vietnamese Canadian population among highest median income and education of Vietnamese Canadians in major cities. There are more than 100 Vietnamese restaurants, hundreds of small size manufacturers of different products from clothing to technology, about 80 pharmacies and hundreds of doctors, dentists, over a thousand scientists, engineers and technicians, about sixty convenient stores and groceries. Since November 2006, Ngo Van Tan has started a project to promote and build the first 'Vietnam Town' in Canada called 'Vietnamville' near metro Jean Talon including St-Denis, Jean Talon, St-Hubert, and Belanger streets with over 130 businesses already opened in the area. Investment opportunities in Vietnam Town are open to Vietnamese worldwide.

See also

 Canada–Vietnam relations
 Overseas Vietnamese
 Asian Canadians
 Vietnamese in Toronto

References

External links
Vietnamese Canadian organizations
 Vietnamese Canadian Federation (Non-profit organization)
 Fondation VinaVie Humanitaire (Non-profit organization)
 Vietnamese Canadian Community of Ottawa (Non-profit organization)
 Radio Tieng Noi Tre (Non-profit organization)
 Youths In Action Sports (Non-profit organization)
 UniAction - Promoting Vietnamese culture and history among other communities (Non-profit organization)
About Vietnamese Canadians
 
 History of Vietnamese Canadians (Source: the Canada's Digital Collections)
 Civilization.ca - Boat People No Longer: Vietnamese Canadians - Religion (the Canadian Museum of Civilization)
 Vietnamese (Discover Vancouver)
 Welcome to Canada (CBC Archives)
 Sponsoring refugees: Canadians reach out (CBC Archives)
 Multicultural Canada website Vietnamese Boat People collection including photographs, correspondence, books, magazines, oral histories, newsletters, personal items, and organizational records.

 
Canada
Asian Canadian
Ethnic groups in Canada
 

pl:Wietnamczycy w Ameryce Północnej